Sue Saliba (born 14 October 1957) is a retired tennis player from Australia who won Australian Open girls' singles championship in 1976

Saliba reached the Wimbledon singles third round in 1980.

References

External links
 
 
 Sue Saliba at Australian Open

1957 births
Living people
Australian female tennis players
Australian Open (tennis) junior champions
Grand Slam (tennis) champions in girls' singles
Place of birth missing (living people)